Air Cargo World, published in the United States, is an air logistics magazine and is edited for shippers and others involved with the worldwide transport and delivery of perishables and manufactured goods. Its readership consists of logistics professionals, airline and airport executives, freight forwarders, importers, exporters, and others who manage or purchase transportation products and services within the airfreight supply chain.

The monthly magazine’s editorial purpose is to provide data analysis, feature articles, and in-depth coverage of events and trends affecting the airfreight logistics industry. With more than 23,000 subscribers located in 184 countries, Air Cargo World maintains the largest circulation of any magazine in the air cargo category.

Air Cargo World conducts an annual Air Cargo Excellence Survey and holds the annual ACE Awards alongside the International Air Transport Association’s World Cargo Symposium conference.

The magazine also maintains a website with daily news items about developments in the air cargo industry. It publishes The Alert, which recounts major news and is emailed to more than 23,000 subscribers throughout the world.

History

Air Transportation was founded in New York City in October 1942 by John F. Budd as the world's first air cargo magazine. The magazine was launched while America was in its tenth month of World War II, and the airfreight industry was in its infancy. A one-year subscription for the United States cost $5.

“Air Transportation is not anti-ship, anti-rail or anti-truck,” Budd wrote in his opening editorial. “It is pro-air, because it believes that, sooner or later, cargo-by-air will be a mighty force with which every shipper should, in his own interest, be familiar.”

The United States Department of War was relying on aircraft to deliver war supplies, but the long-term future of air cargo as an independent industry was in question.

“Despite the hostility air cargo would have to face after the war, the need for it would lift air cargo into its proper place as a serious and vital form of transportation,” Budd wrote in an early Air Transportation editorial.

Richard Malkin, the first full-time air cargo journalist, worked in the field for 60 years, writing for what was then Air Transportation in the 1940s. In 1949, Malkin traveled to Frankfurt, Germany to write a series of articles about the Berlin Airlift.

“Passenger people will disagree with me, but almost from the beginning, I recognized air cargo as the more glamorous and romantic side of the business,” Malkin wrote in the 2002 anniversary issue of Air Cargo World. “I spent the next six decades talking about getting out, yet never got around to doing it. Go figure.”

The magazine eventually changed its name to Air Cargo. In 1983, it became Air Cargo World and moved its office from New York to metro Atlanta, where it has operated for 30 years.

In 2014, Air Cargo World was acquired  by Royal Media Group, a New York-based information company.

Air Cargo Excellence
The Air Cargo Excellence awards, known as the ACE Awards, are based on the Air Cargo Excellence Survey, which is carried out and published annually by Air Cargo World. Established in 2005, the survey measures airlines and airports on specific criteria and ranks them to identify above or below average performance.

The survey also shows exactly how airlines and airports are performing against an industry average and specifically highlights areas in need of improvement.

Past magazine titles
Air Transportation (1942–1968)
Air Cargo (1969)
Cargo Airlift (1969–1976)
Air Cargo (1977–1982)
Air Cargo World (1983–Present)

Past publishers
John F. Budd
Robert R. Parrish
Martin B. Deutsch
Richard L. Gower
Susan Barbey
John F. Gorsuch
Steve Prince
JJ Hornblass (present)

Past editors
John F. Budd
Richard Malkin
Martin B. Deutsch
Robert N. Veres
Marie Powers
Linda Parham
David I. Premo
Nancy Gores
Paul Page
Simon Keeble
Jon Ross
John McCurry 
Randy Woods 
Caryn Livingston
Ivan De Luce (present)

References

1942 establishments in New York City
Monthly magazines published in the United States
Aviation magazines
International trade
Magazines established in 1942
Magazines published in Seattle